Shein Makkar Monastery is a historic Buddhist monastery in Wetlet, Sagaing Region, Myanmar that was donated and built in 1862 by King Mindon.

Location

History

When King Mindon toured the country in 1862, he arrived at the Shein Makkar and had a chance to pay homage to Sayadaw U Jāgara, the coming Shwegyin Sayadaw originated one. King Mindon donated and built monasteries and buildings there in the forest with stone caves where Sayadaw meditated and old religious buildings could be observed as origin as its ancient times infrastructure.

Wildlife sanctuary

King Mindon was designated the Shein Makkar forest at Burma's first wildlife sanctuary in 1862. The sanctuary spans 334 acres and is home to rare flora and fauna, including golden deer, spotted deer, rabbits and different species of birds. The area is managed by the Ministry of Natural Resources and Environmental Conservation.

See also
Shein Makkar village

References

19th-century establishments in Burma
Monasteries in Myanmar
Buddhist temples in Mandalay